Réau is a commune in the Seine-et-Marne department in the Île-de-France region in north-central France.

Ferme de Galande 

Around 1881, sugar beet producer Arthur Brandin invested in a Decauville railway with eight horse-drawn tipping lorries for the Ferme de Galande near Réau, 15 km east of the Decauville factory in Petit Bourg. As well as being a sugar beet farmer, he was also mayor of Réau and Republican Consul of the Canton of Brie-Comte-Robert from 1895 to 1912. The surface soil of his sugar beet fields consisted of clay in which fragments of siliceous sandstone were embedded, used for millstones and structural purposes. The subsoil was limestone, so the fields were often very muddy at harvest time until Brandin installed an innovatively designed drainage system.

Demographics
The inhabitants are called  Réaltais.

See also
Communes of the Seine-et-Marne department

References

External links

1999 Land Use, from IAURIF (Institute for Urban Planning and Development of the Paris-Île-de-France région) 

Communes of Seine-et-Marne
Sénart
Decauville